Mannofield is a cricket ground in the Mannofield district of Aberdeen, Scotland. The cricket ground is the home of the Aberdeenshire Cricket Club and the Scotland national cricket team regularly plays international matches at this venue.

History
The first recorded match on the ground dates back to 1879 when Aberdeen University played Edinburgh University. The first first-class match to be held on the ground came in 1930 when Scotland played Ireland national cricket team. The ground has been host to many great cricketing names over the years, most notably Sir Donald Bradman, who scored his last century on British soil at the ground in 1948.

The ground has since played host to 12 first-class matches, the last of which came in August 2009 when Scotland played Ireland in the 2009–10 ICC Intercontinental Cup.

The ground has also played host to 18 One Day Internationals (ODI), the first of which came in the 2008 Associates Tri-Series in Scotland when Ireland played New Zealand. The last ODI to date came in August 2019 when Oman beat Papua New Guinea in an ICC Cricket World Cup League match.

It was selected to host Scotland's World Cricket League and Intercontinental Cup matches in August 2016. In May 2019, the International Cricket Council (ICC) named it as the venue for the opening round of fixtures of the 2019–22 ICC Cricket World Cup League 2 tournament.

International centuries

One-Day Internationals
Seven ODI centuries have been scored at the venue.

International Five-wicket Hauls

One-Day Internationals
Only one five-wicket haul has been taken at the venue.

References

External links
Mannofield Park at Cricinfo
Mannofield Park at CricketArchive

Sports venues in Aberdeen
Cricket grounds in Scotland
Sports venues completed in 1879